The Kenya national football team has represented Kenya in international association football since 1926. The governing body of Kenyan football, the Football Kenya Federation (FKF), was founded in 1946 and became a member of FIFA in 1960. The team participated in its first international match on 1 May 1926, drawing 1–1 with Uganda.

Players

References

 
Kenya
Association football player non-biographical articles